The South Korea women's national baseball team is a national team of South Korea and is controlled by the Korea Baseball Association. It represents the nation in women's international competition. The team is a member of the Baseball Federation of Asia.

Women
Korea, South